Ranoli is a census town in Anand district in the Indian state of Gujarat.

Demographics
 India census, Ranoli had a population of 11,057. Males constitute 54% of the population and females 46%. Ranoli has an average literacy rate of 74%, higher than the national average of 59.5%: male literacy is 1%, and female literacy is 65%. In Ranoli, 12% of the population is under 6 years of age.

References

Cities and towns in Vadodara district